Carolina Bartczak (born October 5, 1985) is a Canadian actress of Polish descent. She is known for her role as Magda Lehnsherr, the wife of Erik Lehnsherr/Magneto, in X-Men: Apocalypse and as Maura Mackenzie in the CBC film An Audience of Chairs.

Early life 
Carolina Bartczak was born in Germany after her parents escaped the Martial law in Poland. She eventually immigrated to Canada with her family and grew up in Kitchener, Ontario. She studied biochemistry at the University of Toronto and worked as a travel writer/photographer in southern Croatia. She turned to acting in 2009 and attended the Neighborhood Playhouse School of the Theatre in New York City. Carolina Bartczak has dual citizenship between Canada and Poland and speaks French and Polish fluently.

Career 
Carolina Bartczak's first role was playing the voice of Alfred Hedgehog in the cartoon The Mysteries of Alfred Hedgehog. Her first on screen role was playing a high maintenance mother opposite Brendan Gleeson, and Neil Patrick Harris in The Smurfs 2. Bartczak also played Nurse Clara in the action film Brick Mansions opposite Paul Walker and as Amanda Dean in the film Business Ethics opposite Larenz Tate. Her most famous role has been playing Magda Lehnsherr, the wife of Erik Lehnsherr in the Marvel comic series X-Men. In X-Men: Apocalypse, Erik Lehnsherr, played by Michael Fassbender, becomes Magneto after he is enraged by Magda's murder. In 2018, she was cast as the lead in a film by the CBC, An Audience of Chairs  written by Rosemary House. Carolina Bartczak plays Maura, a beautiful woman suffering from mental illness based on a novel of the same name written by Joan Clark. The film was released in Canada on March 22, 2019. Carolina played the role of Brenda Lopez, starring opposite Halle Berry, Patrick Wilson, Charlie Plummer, and Michael Peña in the  Roland Emmerich 2022 Sci-Fi action film, Moonfall by Lionsgate.

Filmography

References

External links 
 

1985 births
Living people
Canadian film actresses
Canadian television actresses
Canadian voice actresses
People from Gehrden
Actresses from Kitchener, Ontario
German emigrants to Canada
Canadian people of Polish descent